The United States competed at the 2022 Winter Paralympics in Beijing, China which took place between 4–13 March 2022. In total, 65 athletes competed in six sports. It was the second largest delegation at the Games after the host China. Para ice hockey is represented by the most athletes, with 17.

Julie Dussliere served as the team's Chef de Mission. Tyler Carter and Danelle Umstead served as flag bearers during the opening ceremony. Keith Gabel was the flag bearer during the closing ceremony.

Medalists

The following U.S. competitors won medals at the games. In the by discipline sections below, medalists' names are bolded.

Competitors
The following is the list of number of competitors participating at the Games per sport/discipline.

Alpine skiing

United States competed in alpine skiing.

Men

Women

Biathlon

United States competed in biathlon.

Men

Women

Cross-country skiing

United States competed in cross-country skiing.

Distance
Men

Women

Mixed/Open

Sprint
Men

Women

Para ice hockey

The United States competed in para ice hockey.

Summary

Team USA was supposed to face the Russian Paralympic Committee (then renamed Neutral Paralympic Athletes after the invasion of Ukraine) before the Russian team was banned.

Preliminary round

Semifinal

Gold medal game

Snowboarding

United States competed in snowboarding.

Slalom
Men

Women

Snowboard cross
Men

Qualification legend: Q - Qualify to next round; FA - Qualify to medal final; FB - Qualify to consolation final

Women

Qualification legend: Q - Qualify to next round; FA - Qualify to medal final; FB - Qualify to consolation final

Wheelchair curling

United States competed in wheelchair curling.

Summary

Round robin

Draw 1
Saturday, March 5, 14:35

Draw 2
Saturday, March 5, 19:35

Draw 4
Sunday, March 6, 14:35

Draw 6
Monday, March 7, 9:35

Draw 8
Monday, March 7, 19:35

Draw 11
Tuesday, March 8, 19:35

Draw 13
Wednesday, March 9, 14:35

Draw 14
Wednesday, March 9, 19:35

Draw 15
Thursday, March 10, 9:35

Draw 16
Thursday, March 10, 14:35

See also
United States at the Paralympics
United States at the 2022 Winter Olympics

References

Nations at the 2022 Winter Paralympics
2022
Winter Paralympics